Clemensia incerta is a moth of the family Erebidae. It is found in French Guiana.

References

Cisthenina
Moths described in 1983